Charles Chester McCracken (1882–1957) was an American academic administrator who served as the sixth president of the University of Connecticut (1930–1935). Prior to assuming the presidency at UConn, he taught as a professor of school administration at Ohio State University from 1917 to 1930. President McCracken oversaw the changing of the college's name from Connecticut Agricultural College to Connecticut State College in 1933, following a long campaign by students, faculty, and alumni. During McCracken's tenure, the college shifted toward a more comprehensive liberal arts curriculum, doubling graduate studies and establishing the departments of music, government, philosophy, agricultural engineering, and psychology. The college joined the New England Association of Colleges and Secondary Schools and the Association of State Universities in 1930 and celebrated its fiftieth anniversary in 1931. Enrollment grew and finances improved despite the economic impact of the Great Depression. Despite these accomplishments, McCracken quickly proved unpopular with faculty and lost the trust of the college's trustees and state legislators. He resigned in 1935 to become director of the Board of Christian Education of the Presbyterian Church in Philadelphia.

Born in Bellefontaine, Ohio, in 1882, McCracken graduated high school in 1899, received his bachelor's degree from Monmouth College in 1908, and taught in public schools for several years in Illinois and Ohio. He earned his master's degree from Harvard University in 1911, served three years as dean of the normal college at Ohio Northern University, and then returned to Harvard on a fellowship and received his PhD in 1916, soon after taking charge of the Department of Psychology and Education at Western College for Women. In 1927 and 1928, he served as a member of a commission of the United States Bureau of Education to survey historically black colleges and universities. In 1928, he took a lengthy leave of absence from his Ohio State University professorship to consult for the Board of Christian Education of the Presbyterian Church on college education initiatives. McCracken served on the board of the American Council on Education and was a member of Pi Kappa Delta and the American Association for the Advancement of Science.

McCracken died at home in 1957, after a long illness. He was survived by his wife, Cleo, and their four children.

References 

1882 births
1957 deaths
Harvard University alumni
Monmouth College alumni
Presidents of the University of Connecticut
American academic administrators
Heads of universities and colleges in the United States
People from Bellefontaine, Ohio
20th-century American academics